Gerger Russkiy ("Russian Gerger") may refer to:
 Garrgarr, Armenia
 Pushkino, Armenia